The 1969 Portugal earthquake struck western Portugal and Morocco on February 28 at 02:40 UTC. Originating west of the Strait of Gibraltar, the earthquake registered a magnitude of 7.8 and the maximum felt intensity was VII (Very strong) on the Mercalli intensity scale. In total, 13 people died and 80 sustained minor injuries. It is the largest earthquake to hit Portugal since the 1755 Lisbon earthquake.

Tectonic setting

The epicenter of the earthquake lies within a diffuse zone of seismicity known as the Azores–Gibraltar seismic belt, which marks the boundary between the African Plate and the Eurasian Plate. The deformation at this plate boundary is transpressional in style, with dextral (right lateral) strike-slip accompanied by slow convergence (4 mm/yr). Linear bathymetric features within this zone, such as the SW–NE trending Gorringe Bank, are thought to be a result of reverse faulting. Investigations using multibeam swathe bathymetry have revealed additional SW–NE trending reverse faults and fold axes and a set of WNW–ESE trending lineaments, interpreted as strike-slip faults. The earthquake was located within the Horseshoe Abyssal Plain, where active reverse faulting has been imaged on seismic reflection data.

Damage and casualties 
At magnitude 7.8, the earthquake was considered very powerful. The resulting damage killed 13 people (11 in Morocco and 2 in Portugal). Damage to local buildings was "moderate", according to the United States Geological Survey. Overall, structures were prepared for the earthquake and responded well, sustaining slight, if any, damage.

Characteristics
The earthquake is interpreted to have resulted from movement on a southeast-dipping reverse fault.

See also 
List of earthquakes in 1969
List of earthquakes in Portugal
List of earthquakes in Morocco
1761 Portugal earthquake

References

External links 

Earthquakes in Portugal
Portugal Earthquake, 1969
Earthquakes in Morocco
Earthquake
1969 in Morocco
1969 tsunamis